The 2011–12 season was Eintracht Frankfurt's 112th season and their 1st season in the 2. Bundesliga after being relegated from the Bundesliga for the 4th time.

The 2011–12 season saw Eintracht play local rival FSV Frankfurt in a league match for the first time in almost 50 years. The last league game between the two had been played on 27 January 1962, then in the Oberliga Süd. For the first of the two matches, FSV's home game on 21 August 2011, the decision was made to move to Eintracht's stadium as FSV's Volksbankstadion only holds less than 11,000 spectators and in excess of 40,000 spectators were expected for the game. The game, held in front of over 50,000 spectators, ended in a 4–0 victory for Eintracht.

Transfers

Results 
Pre-season matches

League matches

Domestic Cup

League matches

Test match

League matches

Test match

League matches

Test match

League matches

Test match

League matches

Domestic Cup

League matches

Indoor soccer tournament

Indoor soccer tournament

Test matches

League matches

Test matches

League matches

Test matches

League matches

Test matches

League matches

Test matches

League matches

Test matches

Source: Notes: * Fixture date not yet fixed

References

Sources 
 Official English Eintracht website 
 Eintracht-Archiv.de
 Eintracht Frankfurt on the kicker sports magazine

2011–12
German football clubs 2011–12 season